Aan de Pegstukken (English: At the Pegstukken) is a windmill located on De Pegstukken 27 in Schijndel, North Brabant, Netherlands. Built in 1845 on an artificial hill, the windmill functioned as a gristmill. The mill is a national monument (nr 33574) since 19 September 1973. The name of the mill comes from the street it is located on.

History 
The mill was built in 1845 on order of the family De Backer. During World War II it was part of the frontline and took damage. It was restored after the war. In 1967 the municipality bought the mill from the De Backer family and had it restored. In later days houses were built around the mill, decreasing its visibility and the wind it can catch.

The mill is open to the public once a week on Saturdays.

Gallery of images

References

Windmills in North Brabant
Rijksmonuments in North Brabant
Tower mills in the Netherlands
Grinding mills in the Netherlands
Windmills completed in 1845
Towers completed in 1845
Meierijstad